Jacobini is an Italian surname. Notable people with the surname include:

Diomira Jacobini (1899–1959), Italian actress
Domenico Jacobini (1837–1900), Italian cardinal
Luigi Jacobini (1832–1887), Italian cardinal
Maria Jacobini (1892–1944), Italian actress
Paolo Jacobini  (1919-2003), Italian footballer

Italian-language surnames